Cephalopholis miniata, also known as the coral grouper, coral hind, coral rock cod, coral cod, coral trout, round-tailed trout or vermillion seabass is a species of marine ray-finned fish, a grouper from the subfamily Epinephelinae which is in the family Serranidae which also includes the anthias and sea basses. It is associated with coral reefs and occurs in the Indo-Pacific.

Description
Cephalopholis miniata has a body which is 2.6-3.0 times as long in standard length as it is deep. The dorsal profile of the head is flat to slightly convex between the eyes. It has a rounded, finely serrated preopercle, which has a fleshy lower edge. The maxilla extends beyond the rear of the eye. The membranes of the dorsal fin have distinct indentations between the spines. There are 47-56 scales in the lateral line. The dorsal fin has 9 spines and 14-15 soft rays while the anal fin has 3 spines and 8-9 soft rays. The colour of the body is orange-red to reddish brown with many small bright blue spots that cover the head, body and the dorsal, anal and caudal fins. They sometimes have diagonal paler bars on the flanks. The colour of the juveniles is orange to yellow with fewer widely separated faint blue spots.

Distribution
Cephalopholis miniata has a wide Indo-Pacific distribution from eastern coast of Africa where it occurs from the Red Sea to Durban in South Africa and east through the Indian Ocean and into the Pacific as far as the Line Islands. It occurs as far north as southern Japan and south to northern Australia. Its occurs in most islands of the Indian Ocean and the west-central Pacific but it has not been recorded from the Persian Gulf and the Gulf of Oman. There are also records from southwestern India and the Andaman Sea coasts of Thailand. In Australia it is found from the Houtman Abrolhos in Western Australia to Wigram Island, Northern Territory and the northern Great Barrier Reef to Moreton Bay in Queensland, it is also found at Middleton Reef and Elizabeth Reef in the Coral Sea and Lord Howe Island in the Tasman Sea.

Habitat and biology
Cephalopholis miniata is found in clear water where there are coastal and offshore coral reefs, it prefers exposed rather than protected areas. It is often seen in caves and below ledges. Like other groupers this species is predatory; over 80% of its diet consists of small fish, predominantly sea goldies (Pseudanthias squamipinnis) which are ambushed by the coral hind in a sudden rush up from the substrate. The remainder of its diet consists of crustaceans. They form harems consisting of a single male and up to 12 females. Coral hinds are protogynous hermaphrodite and they change sex from female to male. The male patrols the territory and visits each female, swimming parallel to each other when they meet.

Taxonomy
Cephalopholis miniata was first formally described as Perca miniata by the Swedish explorer, orientalist and naturalist Peter Forsskål (1732-1763) with the type locality given as Jeddah.

Utilisation
Cephalopholis miniata is an important species in commercial fisheries at the local level and is caught using hook and line, fish traps and spears. It is also a quarry species for recreational angling. It is a colourful species and is popular in public aquaria and forms a minor part of the aquarium trade.

Gallery

References

External links
 
 Coral grouper/Coral hind BBC. Updated July 2005. Retrieved May 2013.
 

Cephalopholis
Fish of Palau
Fish described in 1775
Fish of Thailand